From January 14 to June 14, 1988, Republican voters chose their nominee for president in the 1988 United States presidential election. Incumbent Vice President George H. W. Bush was selected as the nominee through a series of primary elections and caucuses culminating in the 1988 Republican National Convention held from August 15 to August 18, 1988, in New Orleans, Louisiana.

Primary race 
Vice President George H. W. Bush had the support of President Ronald Reagan and pledged to continue Reagan's policies, but also pledged a "kinder and gentler nation" in an attempt to win over some more moderate voters. Bush faced some prominent challengers for the GOP nomination, despite his front-runner status.

At the start of the primary election season in early 1988, televangelist Pat Robertson's campaign was attacked because of a statement he had made about his military service. In his campaign literature, he stated he was a combat Marine who served in the Korean War. Other Marines in his battalion contradicted Robertson's version, claiming he had never spent a day in a combat environment. They asserted that instead of fighting in the war, Robertson's primary responsibility was supplying alcoholic beverages for his officers. (See Education and military service).

In 1987, Donald Trump, then known as a New York real estate executive and registered as a Republican, hinted in various television interviews that he was considering running for President. He took out a series of newspaper ads in The New York Times, The Washington Post, and The Boston Globe criticizing Reagan's foreign policy for being too expensive. He also vocally advocated reducing foreign aid to Japan, Kuwait, and Saudi Arabia; accelerating nuclear disarmament negotiations with the Soviet Union; and eliminating the federal deficit. Mike Dunbar, an important Republican operative, started a "draft Donald Trump" movement to try to convince him to run in the New Hampshire primaries. However, Trump eventually announced at a political rally arranged by Dunbar in Portsmouth, New Hampshire, that he would not seek the Republican nomination. Later, Trump approached Bush's campaign manager Lee Atwater asking to be considered as a possible choice for running mate. Bush found the request "strange and unbelievable." Apparently contradicting this report, Trump later asserted it was Atwater who approached him asking if he was interested in the position. Trump would eventually win the 2016 Republican Party presidential primaries and go on to win the presidential election against his Democratic opponent Hillary Clinton.

Robertson's campaign got off to a strong second-place finish in the Iowa caucuses, ahead of Bush. Robertson did poorly in the subsequent New Hampshire primary, however, and was unable to be competitive once the multiple-state primaries like Super Tuesday began. Robertson ended his campaign before the primaries were finished. His best finish was in Washington, winning the majority of caucus delegates. However, his controversial win has been credited to procedural manipulation by Robertson supporters who delayed final voting until late into the evening when other supporters had gone home. He later spoke at the 1988 Republican National Convention in New Orleans and told his remaining supporters to cast their votes for Bush, who ended up winning the nomination and the election. He then returned to the Christian Broadcasting Network and has remained there as a religious broadcaster.

Bush unexpectedly came in third in the Iowa caucus (that he had won back in 1980), behind Senator Bob Dole and Robertson. Dole was also leading in the polls of the New Hampshire primary, and the Bush camp responded by running television commercials portraying Dole as a tax raiser, while Governor John H. Sununu stumped for Bush. These efforts enabled the Vice President to defeat Dole and gain crucial momentum. Embittered by his loss in New Hampshire, Dole told Bush directly, on live television that evening, to "stop lying about my record."

Once the multiple-state primaries began, Bush's organizational strength and fundraising lead were impossible for the other candidates to match, and the nomination was his. The Republican party convention was held in New Orleans, Louisiana. Bush was nominated unanimously.

In his acceptance speech, Bush made an energetic pledge, "Read my lips: No new taxes", a comment that would come to haunt him in the 1992 election.

Candidates

Nominee

Withdrew before convention

Candidates who received less than 1%

Declined to Seek Nomination

Endorsements 
George H. W. Bush
 President Ronald Reagan (announced May 12, 1988)
 Former Senator and 1964 Presidential nominee Barry Goldwater of Arizona
 Reverend Jerry Falwell
 Texas Governor Bill Clements
 Representative Bob Dornan of California
 New Hampshire Governor John Sununu

Bob Dole
 Senator Strom Thurmond of South Carolina
 Former Governor of Texas John Connally
 Former Secretary of State and former presidential candidate Alexander Haig
 Senator Warren Rudman of New Hampshire

Jack Kemp
 House Minority Whip Trent Lott of Mississippi
 Representative Newt Gingrich of Georgia
 Representative Bob Smith of New Hampshire
 Senator Gordon Humphrey of New Hampshire

Pete duPont
 New Hampshire Union Leader in Manchester, New Hampshire

Polling

National polling

Results

Statewide

Nationwide 
Popular vote results:
 George H. W. Bush - 8,253,512 (67.90%)
 Bob Dole - 2,333,375 (19.19%)
 Pat Robertson - 1,097,446 (9.02%)
 Jack Kemp - 331,333 (2.72%)
 Unpledged - 756,990 (4.48%)
 Pierre S. du Pont IV - 49,783 (0.41%)
 Alexander M. Haig - 26,619 (0.22%)
 Harold Stassen - 2,682 (0.01%)

Running mate 

After Bush locked up the nomination in March, conventional wisdom leaned toward the notion of a Southern running mate to balance the ticket. The former Governor of Tennessee, Lamar Alexander, was seen by many as the most logical choice, and some early reports described him as Bush's personal preference. Another high-profile possibility, also from Tennessee, was the former Senate Majority Leader and White House Chief of Staff Howard Baker. Despite the early attention – which included a supportive editorial written by former President Richard Nixon – Baker told the press he would prefer to be left out of consideration.

Bush's running mate, however, would not be revealed until August 16, allowing speculation to intensify all the way to the national convention. Bob Dole, who was considered a leading contender based on his second-place finish in the primaries, expressed impatience with the wait but nonetheless made plain his keen desire for the job. So too did Jack Kemp, who confidently told reporters that he would make "a terrific campaigner and a terrific candidate and a terrific vice president". Both men were thought to rank high on Bush's list of potential picks.

Other highly rated prospects included two people quite close to Dole. His wife, Elizabeth Dole, had served as Transportation Secretary under President Reagan and was a popular figure among conservatives and women – two key demographics that Bush was struggling to galvanize. A second option was Dole's fellow U.S. Senator from Kansas, Nancy Kassebaum. Other figures who were believed to be under Bush's close consideration included the Governor of Nebraska Kay Orr, the former Governor of Pennsylvania Dick Thornburgh, the Governor of New Jersey Tom Kean, and the sitting U.S. Senators Bill Armstrong of Colorado, Pete Domenici of New Mexico, and Richard Lugar and Dan Quayle, both of Indiana.

U.S. Senator Alan Simpson of Wyoming was also widely believed to be a possible selection, but he publicly stated that he wasn't interested in the position. This placed him in the company of Baker and others who had declared that they did not want to be considered, such as the Governor of California George Deukmejian and the Governor of Illinois Jim Thompson. Shortly ahead of the convention, however, Bush reopened speculation about all of them when he implied that he would not necessarily give up on any demurring prospects.

Long-shot possibilities included several Republicans who were popular in their home states but held limited name recognition nationally, such as U.S. Representative Lynn Martin of Illinois, the Governor of South Carolina Carroll Campbell, and the two U.S. Senators of Missouri, John Danforth and Christopher Bond. Nontraditional selections who were seen as credible alternatives included the National Security Advisor Colin Powell, the former UN Ambassador Jeane Kirkpatrick, Education Secretary William Bennett, former EPA Administrator William Ruckelshaus, and even Supreme Court Justice Sandra Day O'Connor.

Bush announced his selection of 41-year-old Dan Quayle on the second day of the convention.

See also 
 1988 Democratic Party presidential primaries

References

External links 
 Booknotes interview with Dayton Duncan on Grass Roots: One Year in the Life of the New Hampshire Presidential Primary, March 31, 1991.